Sangeeth Sasidharan (born 23 May 1983), better known by his stage name Shashankan Mayyanad, is an Indian actor, comedian and screenwriter who works in Malayalam films, television and stage shows. He began his career working in mimicry troops as comedian and writer, later attained popularity by contesting in the reality TV show Comedy Stars on Asianet. He debuted as a screenwriter in 2019 with the comedy-drama Margamkali.

Early life
Sasankan was born at Mayyanad in Kollam, Kerala to Sasidharan, a classical dancer, and Sarada, a singer. He studied till 10th standard and then joined in various professional mimicry troops in Kerala. He started with Kottayam Kalabhavana mimicry troop and later got an opportunity to do a comedy skit in 'Vodafone Comedy Stars' by the popular Malayalam entertainment channel Asianet in 2009, which became a huge success.

Personal life
Sasankan married Merlin (Anney). They have a daughter named Sivani.

Filmography

References

External links
 

21st-century Indian male actors
Male actors from Kollam
Living people
Male actors in Malayalam cinema
Indian male film actors
1983 births